With The Sydney Symphony Live at the Sydney Opera House is a DVD release by Australian singer John Farnham. The DVD was released in Australia on 29 April 2006.

This DVD contains John Farnham's performance at the Sydney Opera House, Sydney in 2006 with the Sydney Symphony Orchestra. This program was originally aired on Australia's Channel Seven in 2006.

DVD track listing
 "Heading in the Right Direction" (M. Punch, G. Paige) – 4:37
 "Come Back Again" (R. Wilson) – 5:30
 "Downhearted" (B. McDonough, G. McDonough, S. Higgins) – 5:05
 "Girls on the Avenue" (R. Clapton) – 4:59
 "No Aphrodisiac" (T. Freedman, G. Dormand, M. Ford) – 6:25
 "Man of the Hour" (S. Hostin, D. Deviller, S. Kipner) – 4:28
 "Green Limousine" (M. Spiby) – 4:03
 "Come Said the Boy" (E. McCusker) – 4:37
 "Tryin' To Live My Life Without You" (E. Williams) – 3:43
 "I Remember When I Was Young" (M. Taylor) – 4:49
 "Reasons" (S. See) – 5:02
 "One" (H. Nilsson) – 3:49
 "Age of Reason" (T. Hunter, J. Pigott) – 7:01
 "A Touch of Paradise" (R. Wilson, G. Smith) – 4:54
 "Everytime You Cry" (S. Peiken, G. Sutton) – 4:21
 "Pressure Down" (H. Bogdanovs) – 6:33
 "Burn for You" (P. Buckle, J. Farnham, R. Faser) – 6:59
 "Help!" (J. Lennon, P. McCartney) – 5:04
 "That's Freedom" (T. Kimmel, J. Chapman) – 4:27
 "Playing to Win" (G. Goble, J. Farnham, D. Hirschfelder, S. Housden, S. Proffer, W. Nelson, S. Prestwich) – 4:06
 "We Will Rock You" (B. May) – 3:23
 "You're the Voice" (M. Ryder, C. Thompson, A. Qunta, K. Reid) – 5:43
 "I Remember When I Was Young: A Chat With Jack" [Bonus Track] – 12:20

Charts

Weekly charts

Year-end charts

Certifications

References

John Farnham video albums
2006 video albums
Live video albums
Collaborative albums
2006 live albums
Albums recorded at the Sydney Opera House